Des Peres Presbyterian Church (Old Des Peres Church;Old Stone Church) is a historic church on 2255 Geyer Road in Frontenac, Missouri.

It was started in 1834 and was added to the National Register in 1978.

Elijah Parish Lovejoy was an early pastor of the church while also serving as an editor of the abolitionist St. Louis Observer.

Former Major League Baseball players George Sisler and Dave Sisler are buried in the church's cemetery.

References

Presbyterian churches in Missouri
Churches on the National Register of Historic Places in Missouri
Churches completed in 1834
Religious buildings and structures in St. Louis County, Missouri
National Register of Historic Places in St. Louis County, Missouri
1834 establishments in Missouri